= Frank Seeburger =

American architect (1869–1942)

- Born: 1869; Philadelphia, Pennsylvania, U.S.
- Died: 1942 (aged 72–73)
- Occupation: Architect

Frank Seeburger (1869–1942) was an American architect who designed many buildings in the state of Pennsylvania.
